The Best of Howard Jones is a compilation album by the British pop musician Howard Jones. It compiles key hits and album tracks from 1983–1992 during Jones's tenure on the Warner music label, plus one new track, a cover of Donald Fagen's "I.G.Y. (What a Beautiful World)". It does not include his last UK Top 40 hit 'All I Want' from 1986. The album was a success, particularly in the UK where it was certified silver.

Track listing 
All songs by Howard Jones unless otherwise noted.
 "What Is Love?" (Jones/William Bryant) – 3:41 from Human's Lib
 "New Song" – 4:15 from Human's Lib
 "Pearl in the Shell" – 3:59 from Human's Lib
 "Always Asking Questions" (Jones/William Bryant) – 3:41 from The 12" Album
 "Things Can Only Get Better" – 3:57 from Dream into Action
 "Like to Get to Know You Well" – 4:01 from Dream into Action
 "Life in One Day" – 3:39 from Dream into Action
 "You Know I Love You... Don't You?" – 4:05 from One to One
 "Hide and Seek" – 4:49 from Human's Lib
 "No One Is to Blame" (US single version) – 4:12 from Action Replay
 "Look Mama" – 4:05 from Dream into Action
 "The Prisoner" – 4:40 from Cross That Line
 "Everlasting Love" – 4:20 from Cross That Line
 "Lift Me Up" (Jones/Ross Cullum) – 3:40 from In the Running
 "Tears to Tell" – 4:19 from In the Running
 "Two Souls" (Jones/Andy Ross/Ross Cullum) – 4:24 from In the Running
 "I.G.Y. (What a Beautiful World)" (Donald Fagen) – 5:07 Previously unreleased
 "City Song" – 7:16 <small>from In the Running</small>

 References 

 External links 
 The Best Of Howard Jones at Discogs
 The Best Of Howard Jones'' at MusicBrainz

Howard Jones (English musician) albums
1993 greatest hits albums
Elektra Records compilation albums